"Chahunga Main Tujhe" is an Indian Hindi song from the Bollywood film Dosti (1964). The lyrics of the song was written by Majrooh Sultanpuri, and the music was composed by Laxmikant–Pyarelal. Mohammed Rafi was the playback singer of this song. In 1965 Majrooh Sultanpuri received Filmfare award in the best lyrics category for this song. Laxmikant–Pyarelal won their first Filmfare award for composing this song.

Although the song became very popular and got Filmfare awards, the song was planned to be removed from the film. Mohammed Rafi insisted to keep the song in the film. He took only  as his fee as the singer.

Awards 
For this song both the lyricist Majrooh Sultanpuri and the music composer-duo Laxmikant–Pyarelal received Filmfare Awards in the categories of best lyrics, and best music composition respectively.

References

External links 
 

Hindi-language songs
1964 songs
Indian songs
Mohammed Rafi songs
Songs with music by Laxmikant–Pyarelal
Songs with lyrics by Majrooh Sultanpuri